The Cisco Kid is an album by American jazz organist Reuben Wilson recorded in 1973 and released on the Groove Merchant label.

Reception 

Allmusic's Jason Ankeny said: "Reuben Wilson's second Groove Merchant session, The Cisco Kid, pairs the organist with a murderer's-row support unit ... Given the talent involved, it's regrettable that the album adheres to such a pedestrian formula, reimagining the same pop and soul covers as virtually every other jazz-funk session issued at the time".

Track listing
All compositions by Reuben Wilson except where noted.
 "The Cisco Kid" (Thomas Allen, B.B. Dickerson, Harold Brown, Charles Miller, Lonnie Jordan, Lee Oskar, Howard Scott) – 5:19
 "Last Tango in Paris" (Gato Barbieri) – 3:55
 "Superfly" (Curtis Mayfield) – 4:53
 "We've Only Just Begun" (Roger Nichols, Paul Williams) – 4:03
 "Snaps" – 7:17
 "Groove Grease" – 6:45
 "The Look of Love" (Burt Bacharach, Hal David) – 5:15

Personnel
Reuben Wilson – organ
Garnett Brown − trombone
Melvin Sparks − guitar
Bob Cranshaw – bass
Mickey Roker − drums
Ray Amando − congas

References

Groove Merchant albums
Reuben Wilson albums
1973 albums
Albums produced by Sonny Lester